Staro Selo (Cyrillic: Старо Село) is a village in the municipality of Kalesija, Bosnia and Herzegovina.

Demographics 
According to the 2013 census, its population was 22.

References

Populated places in Kalesija